The 2018 Gosport Borough Council election took place on 3 May 2018 to elect members of Gosport Borough Council in England. This was on the same day as other local elections. The election saw the Liberal Democrats gain four seats: two from Labour, and one each from the Conservatives and UKIP. This reduced the Conservative Majority to one, remaining in control of the council, whilst UKIP lost their sole seat, in the Rowner and Holbrook ward.

Voter ID trial

Gosport was one of five boroughs in England operating a voter ID trial, whereby voters had to bring a form of identification with them in order to vote. There was some criticism of the pilot by local politicians ahead of the vote, and in the event 54 people were unable to vote as a result of the trial. The Electoral Commission concluded from the study that "our findings suggest that the 2018 local elections in Gosport were not significantly affected by the voter ID pilot in either its impact on voters or on the administration of the poll. However, it is important to be cautious when drawing conclusions from this pilot about the impact of any wider application of voter ID."

Results

Ward results

Alverstoke

Anglesey

Bridgemary North

Bridgemary South

Brockhurst

Christchurch

Elson

Forton

Grange

Hardway

Lee East

Lee West

Leesland

Peel Common

Privett

Rowner and Holbrook

Town

References 

2018 English local elections
Gosport Borough Council elections
2010s in Hampshire